Nannotrechus is a genus of beetles in the family Carabidae, containing the following species:

 Nannotrechus abkhazicus Belousov, 1998
 Nannotrechus ancestralis Belousov, 1998
 Nannotrechus balkaricus Belousov & Kamarov, 1998
 Nannotrechus bzybicus Belousov, 1998
 Nannotrechus ciscaucasiens Ljovuschkin, 1972
 Nannotrechus fishtensis Belousov, 1989
 Nannotrechus gracilipes Belousov, 1998
 Nannotrechus hoppi Winkier, 1926
 Nannotrechus inguricus Belousov, 1998
 Nannotrechus kovali Belousov, 1989
 Nannotrechus marginalis Belousov, 1998

References

Trechinae